Odensbacken is a locality situated in Örebro Municipality, Örebro County, Sweden with 1,374 inhabitants in 2010.

References 

Populated places in Örebro Municipality